Indian Blood is a play by A. R. Gurney that premiered at the 59East59 Theaters as a Primary Stages production in 2006.  The play starred Charles Socarides as Eddie and Jeremy Blackman as his cousin Lambert.

The play was also staged by the Mixed Company in Pittsfield, Massachusetts in 2008.

References

External links

2006 plays
Plays by A. R. Gurney
New York (state) in fiction
Plays set in the United States